Qutapata (Aymara quta lake, pata step, also spelled Kkotapata, Kotapata) is a  mountain in the Cordillera Real in the Bolivian Andes. It is situated in the La Paz Department, Sud Yungas Province, Irupana Municipality, near the border with the Murillo Province, Palca Municipality. Qutapata lies south-west of the mountain Mururata and north-east of the mountain Wila Quta.

References 

Mountains of La Paz Department (Bolivia)